Lee Tsung-hsiao (born 1963) is a Taiwanese military officer.

By 2012, Lee was working for the office of the Chief of the General Staff. In this role, he met with the Legislative Yuan's  multiple times. He reported on the contract in force between Ching Fu Shipbuilding Company and the Ministry of National Defense in October 2017, and on the status of the TC-2N missile in December 2017. The next year, he briefed legislators about plans to build submarines, the construction of Tuo Jiang-class corvettes in May, the commissioning of Oliver Hazard Perry-class frigates in October, and the design and testing of a fast-attack craft in December. Lee was later appointed vice minister of national defense.

References

1963 births
Republic of China Navy officers
Living people